Leonard "Lenny" Patrick (October 6, 1913 – March 1, 2006) was Jewish-American organized crime figure affiliated with the Italian-American Chicago Outfit. Patrick was involved in bookmaking and extortion and later a government informant.

Emigrating with his family from England. Patrick grew up in the Jewish neighborhood of Lincoln Park, in Chicago's  Near North Side and during Prohibition, eventually becoming an associate and later partner of Greek-American loanshark, extortionist, and political fixer Gus Alex.

Patrick was imprisoned on June 28, 1933 for robbing a bank in Culver, Indiana, and was suspected of participation in six gangland slayings. Patrick was paroled on March 11, 1940, and he continued working for the Chicago Outfit and, by the 1950s, his Westside restaurant hosted one of the biggest illegal sport betting operations in the city. He also expanded into legitimate front businesses, primarily laundry companies, for illegal gambling, loansharking and extortion activities.

In 1992, Patrick agreed to become a government witness following his indictment for racketeering charges. His testimony would result in the conviction of Gus Alex and several other key figures involved in the city's extortion rackets.

Further reading
Abadinsky, Howard. Organized Crime, 5th ed. 1997.
Kelly, Robert J. Encyclopedia of Organized Crime in the United States. Westport, Connecticut: Greenwood Press, 2000. 
Sifakis, Carl. The Mafia Encyclopedia. New York: Da Capo Press, 2005.

External links

1913 births
2006 deaths
Chicago Outfit mobsters
Federal Bureau of Investigation informants
Jewish American gangsters
People who entered the United States Federal Witness Protection Program
20th-century American Jews
21st-century American Jews
British emigrants to the United States